Man Prasad Khatri is a member of 2nd Nepalese Constituent Assembly, representing the Communist Party of Nepal (Unified Marxist–Leninist). He won the Bajhang 1 seat in the 2nd CA assembly in 2013.

References

1963 births
Living people
People from Bajhang District
Communist Party of Nepal (Unified Marxist–Leninist) politicians
Members of the 2nd Nepalese Constituent Assembly